Luther Pemberton  was born on 21 February 1866 in Oswaldtwistle, a small town close to Blackburn and Accrington. He was a English footballer. In 1885 he joined Bell's Temperance F.C., an Accrington based Football Club who played in the 1880's and 1890's competing in the FA Cup.

Season 1888-89
Luther Pemberton made his League debut on 8 September 1888, playing at wing-half, at Anfield, then home of Everton on 8 September 1888. Accrington lost the match 2–1. Luther Pemberton played 16 of Accrington' 22 League games in season 1888–89. Pemberton played wing-half in a midfield that achieved big (three-League-goals-or-more) wins on two occasions. Luther Pemberton helped Accrington to finish 7th in the League, on goal average above Everton.

Season 1889-90
Season 1889-90 was Accrington' most successful season in their short time as members of Football League. Pemberton played 20 League matches, including all nine League wins. He played most of the season at Centre-Half with four League matches played at wing-half. Pemberton played all three of Accrington' FA Cup ties and he played at wing-half.

Statistics
Source:

References

English footballers
Accrington F.C. players
English Football League players
1866 births
1944 deaths
Association football defenders